Bob Wiltshire (24 November 193212 August 2015) was an Australian rules footballer who played with Geelong and North Melbourne in the Victorian Football League (VFL).

Notes

External links 
		

2015 deaths
1932 births
Australian rules footballers from Victoria (Australia)
Geelong Football Club players
North Melbourne Football Club players